The 1893 San Diego mayoral election was held on April 4, 1893 to elect the mayor for San Diego. William H. Carlson was elected Mayor with a plurality of the votes.

Candidates
William H. Carlson, real estate developer
A.E. Cochran, lawyer
James Friend, newspaper writer
Adolph Gassen, former city marshal
John Kastle, real estate developer

Campaign
The 1893 election featured a field of five candidates. The Democrats, Republicans, and the People's Party each fielded one candidate. In addition to the regular parties, two independents also ran.

Many of the candidates had long roots in the City of San Diego prior to the election. Adolph Gassen had previously held other elected office within the City. John Kastle of the People's Party had previously served as president of the Chamber of Commerce. A.E. Cochran had been active in Democratic Party.

Independent candidate William H. Carlson campaigned vigorously, making numerous extravagant campaign promises, including electric car lines on every street, luxury hotels, steamship lines to every port on earth, transcontinental railroads, and jobs with high wages for all. 

On April 4, 1893, Carlson was elected mayor with a plurality of 46.8 percent of the vote, nearly twice as many votes as his closest competitor.

Election results

References

1893
1893 California elections
1890s in San Diego
1893 United States mayoral elections
April 1893 events